Warintapani (Aymara, possibly composed of wari vicuña, tapa nest, -n, -ni suffixes, "the one with a nest of a vicuña", Hispanicized names Huarintapaña, Huarintapani, Hurintapaña) is a  mountain in the Andes of southern Peru. It is situated in the Moquegua Region, Mariscal Nieto Province, Carumas District, and in the Tacna Region, Candarave Province, Candarave District.

See also 
 Churi Laq'a
 Ch'alluma

References

Mountains of Peru
Mountains of Moquegua Region
Mountains of Tacna Region